Watkins-Johnson Company was a designer and manufacturer of electronic devices, systems, and equipment.  The company, commonly referred to as "W-J", was formed in 1957 by Dean A. Watkins and H. Richard Johnson, and was headquartered in Palo Alto, California.  Its products included microwave tubes, followed by solid-state microwave devices, electronic warfare subsystems and systems, receiving equipment, antennas, furnaces and semiconductor manufacturing equipment, and automated test equipment.

History
Partial Corporate Timeline

 December 1957: Watkins-Johnson Company was founded
 June 1963: Acquired Stewart Engineering Company, a manufacturer of backward-wave oscillators
 Fall 1967: Acquired Communication Electronics, Inc. (CEI) of Rockville, Maryland, producer of receivers and related equipment
 June 1968: Listed on New York Stock Exchange
 1970: Acquired RELCOM, manufacturer of electronic components such as mixers
 1970: Acquired antenna product line from Granger Associates
 1978: Opened plant in San Jose, California
 April 1995: Microwave surveillance systems unit sold to Condor Systems, Inc. 
 October 1997: Military devices and subsystem businesses sold to Stellex Industries 
 July 1999: Semiconductor Equipment Group sold to Silicon Valley Group
 August 1999: Telecommunications Group sold to Marconi North America 
 October 1999: Wireless Products Group sold to Fox-Paine and Company 
 August 2000: Initial Public Offering of WJ Communications, W-J successor, by Fox-Paine on NASDAQ 
 March 2008: WJ Communications acquired by TriQuint Semiconductor

The Watkins-Johnson plant in Scotts Valley, California was discovered to have soil and groundwater contamination in 1984. It was added to the EPA's Superfund list in 1990.

References

External links 
 Watkins-Johnson history site
 W-J Tech Notes archive

Electronics companies established in 1957
Defunct companies based in California
Companies based in Palo Alto, California
Electronics companies of the United States
Superfund sites in California
Electronics companies disestablished in 2008
2008 disestablishments in California
1957 establishments in California